Charles Jordan (1838 – 5 October 1912) was an Irish-born New Zealand politician and Anglican clergyman. He was educated at Trinity College Dublin. He was ordained in County Galway on 14 July 1867. He was mayor of Tauranga five times (1885–1886, 1900–1905, 1907–1908, 1909–1910 and 1911–1912).

References

External links
 Mayors of Tauranga, 1882– Tauranga City Council
 History of Tauranga and Western Bay of Plenty
 Canon Charles Jordan (1838–1912) – Genealogy

1838 births
1912 deaths
Mayors of Tauranga
New Zealand people of Irish descent